Laura Pannack (born 12 June 1985) is a British social documentary and portrait photographer, based in London. Pannack's work is often of children and teenagers.

Her work has been shown in three solo exhibitions and contributed to a couple of publications. She has received a number of awards, including a first place in the World Press Photo Awards in 2010, the Vic Odden Award from the Royal Photographic Society in 2012, and the John Kobal New Work Award in 2014.

Education and career

Pannack gained a degree in editorial photography at the University of Brighton; studied a foundation course in painting at Central Saint Martins College of Art, London; and studied a foundation course at London College of Communication.

In 2011 Pannack was included in Creative Review'''s Ones to Watch list and in 2013 in The Magenta Foundation's Emerging Photographers list.

She works commercially and on self initiated personal projects, her subjects often being "young people and teenagers". Her work has been a feature in Wired, Esquire Kazakhstan, Hotshoe, British Journal of Photography, Creative Review and Time. It has been used to illustrate articles in The Sunday Times, Le Monde, Time, The Guardian, The Independent, The Daily Telegraph and The Sunday Telegraph. She has worked commercially for The Mental Health Foundation, Save the Children, Oxfam, Samsung, Barclays and Vodafone.

Pannack's notable personal projects include The Untitled, Young Love and Young British Naturists, For her personal work Pannack largely uses a film camera, at one time a Bronica 645 medium format camera and more recently a Hasselblad 6×6.

Publications
Publications by PannackAgainst The Dying of The Light. Collection du Prix HSBC pour la Photographie. Arles, France: Actes Sud, 2017. . Published on the occasion of the Prix HSBC Pour La Photographie 2017.

Publications with contributions by PannackHijacked III: Australia / United Kingdom. Cottesloe, W.A.: Big City Press; Heidelberg: Kehrer, 2012. . Exhibition catalogue.Great Britons of Photography Vol.1: The Dench Dozen. Eastbourne, UK: Hungry Eye, 2016. . Edited by Peter Dench. With photographs by and transcripts of interviews between Dench and Pannack, Jocelyn Bain Hogg, Marcus Bleasdale, Harry Borden, John Bulmer, Chris Floyd, Brian Griffin, Martin Parr, Tom Stoddart, Homer Sykes, and Anastasia Taylor-Lind. 160 pages. Edition of 500 copies.

ExhibitionsA Collection, Third Floor Gallery, Cardiff, 2011Young British Naturists, One and a Half Gallery, London, 2012Young British Naturists, White Cloth Gallery, Leeds, 2013Youth Without Age, Life Without Death: Chapter 1, Francesca Maffeo Gallery, Southend-on-Sea, UK, 2016.

Awards
2008: 1st place, Hotshot International Next Perspective Award
2009: Winner, Magenta Foundation award
2009: 3rd prize, UK Single Image, LensCulture Award
2009: Finalist, Taylor Wessing Photographic Portrait Prize, for "Gemma"
2010: 1st place, Portraits Singles, World Press Photo Awards, for "Graham"
2010: Best in Show, Foto8 Host Summer Show, for "Shay"
2010: Winner, Magenta Foundation award
2011: 1st place Fine Art Nudes category, International Photography Awards, Lucie Foundation, for Young British Naturists2012: Vic Odden Award, Royal Photographic Society, Bath, UK
2014: John Kobal New Work Award, Taylor Wessing Photographic Portrait Prize, National Portrait Gallery, London for "Chayla in Shul""The John Kobal New Work Award", John Kobal Foundation. Retrieved 18 January 2018.
2014: Hospital Club 100, The Hospital Club, London
2017: Winner, with Melanie Wenger, Prix HSBC pour la Photographie, HSBC France.
2018: Women Seen By Women award, Julia Margaret Cameron Award for Women Photographers, for Purity, a long-term project on people in an Orthodox Jewish community
2021: Winner, Portfolio category, Sony World Photography Awards

References

External links

"The secret world of young British naturists" – a set of photographs at The Guardian''
"Laura Pannack: The Walks" – 7-minute video following Pannack whilst she works, produced by FullBleed, on YouTube

Living people
1985 births
English women photographers
British portrait photographers
Alumni of the University of Brighton
Alumni of Central Saint Martins
21st-century British photographers
Photographers from London
21st-century women photographers
21st-century English women
21st-century English people